Sir William John Berry, KCB (1865 – 5 April 1937) was a British naval architect. A member of the Royal Corps of Naval Constructors, he was Director of Naval Construction from 1924 to 1930.

References 

 https://www.nytimes.com/1937/04/06/archives/sir-william-berry-navy-constructor-director-of-warship-building-for.html
 https://www.ukwhoswho.com/display/10.1093/ww/9780199540891.001.0001/ww-9780199540884-e-206046

1865 births
1937 deaths
Knights Commander of the Order of the Bath
British naval architects
People from Sheerness
Graduates of the Royal Naval College, Greenwich